Hammarby IF Ishockeyförening (or Hammarby Hockey) was a Stockholm-based professional ice hockey team that for most of its history played in Hovet.  Hammarby IF started playing hockey in 1921, playing their first matches using a group of curious bandy players.  Hammarby were giants in the early history of Swedish hockey, playing in Sweden's top league from the birth of Swedish organized hockey in 1922 until 1957.  During that period, they were crowned Swedish champions eight times (1932, 1933, 1936, 1937, 1942, 1943, 1945, and 1951) in 13 attempts.  The rest of their history was more modest, having qualified for play in Elitserien (Sweden's current top-tier league, now called the SHL) only twice, however during their entire existence, they never played in a lower league than the second tier. , five seasons after the club's bankruptcy, Hammarby is 17th in the Marathon standings for the highest division of Swedish ice hockey.

In the 2000s, the club was experiencing severe financial difficulties, having racked up a debt of over 4 million SEK, and having difficulties affording the lease for their arena. By February 2008, the choice was to play in the third-tier league or file for bankruptcy, as the club was in a demotion spot in the standings and had announced that they were in no position to participate in the Kvalserien tournament to defend their spot in HockeyAllsvenskan. Hammarby Hockey declared bankruptcy on 22 April 2008, after 87 years of hockey under the name of "Hammarby IF".

That same year, supporters of Hammarby Hockey started a new ice hockey club named Bajen Fans IF, which would rebuild from Division 4.  After rapidly climbing through the Swedish hockey system, the new club has renamed itself Hammarby Hockey and joined the Hammarby IF umbrella organization.

Notable players

List criteria:
 player has won at least three Swedish championships with Hammarby IF, or
 has received the honorary award Stora Grabbars Märke from the Swedish Ice Hockey Association playing the majority of their career at the club, or
 is a member of the IIHF Hall of Fame or Swedish Hockey Hall of Fame, starting or playing the majority of their career at the club, or
 has won at least one medal with their country in the Olympic Games or World Championships while playing for Hammarby IF.

Seasons

Notes

External links
 The current Hammarby Hockey official website
 Bamsingarna supporter's club

References

 
 
 
 
 

 
Hockey
Defunct ice hockey teams in Sweden
1921 establishments in Sweden
Ice hockey clubs established in 1921
2008 disestablishments in Sweden
Ice hockey clubs disestablished in 2008